Kurumpirai is a village in the Cheyyur taluk under Polambakkam postal area of Chengalpattu district, Tamil Nadu, India. It is located 92 kilometres from Chennai and 7 kilometres from Melmaruvathur.

References

Villages in Chengalpattu district